Nesokia is a genus of rodent in the family Muridae endemic to West Asia and Central Asia known as the short-tailed bandicoot rats.

Species 
Genus Nesokia - short-tailed bandicoot rats:
 Short-tailed bandicoot rat (Nesokia indica) Gray, 1842
 Bunn's short-tailed bandicoot rat (Nesokia bunnii) (Khajuria, 1981)

References

 

 
Rodent genera
Taxa named by John Edward Gray
Taxonomy articles created by Polbot